The Kanghaenggun-class ("Forced March") is a class of electric locomotives for freight trains operated by the Korean State Railway on mainlines, especially the important P'yŏngŭi Line. They were converted to 3,000 V DC electric operation by the Kim Chong-t'ae Electric Locomotive Works from Soviet-built K62-class diesel locomotives.

A similar projects have been undertaken by the Azerbaijan Railways, who have converted one 2-section 2M62 locomotive to electric operation as well, using parts from a VL8 electric locomotive, and by a Polish train operating company , a subsidiary of Rail World, who used a bespoke electric equipment.

Description

Through the 1990s, North Korea suffered through a severe economic crisis, made worse by severe floods in 1995 and 1996, and a drought in 1997. This period is known as the "Arduous March" or "Forced March"; the class derives its name from this. The economic crisis also made obtaining diesel fuel extremely difficult, so the Korean State Railways decided to convert a number of diesel locomotives to electric operation, as intensive efforts have been made to restore as much generation of electricity as possible, with fair success over the past years.

As a result, in 1998 the Kim Chong-t'ae works began a program to convert the more decrepit M62-type diesels in the KSR's inventory to electric operation. This was achieved by removing the diesel engine, fuel tanks and other unneeded equipment, and the installation of the necessary transformers and related gear to convert the power collected from the overhead lines, via newly-installed pantographs, to the traction motors. The resulting unit is considerably lighter than the diesel version, and sound like oversized streetcars. Like the original diesels, these produce , making suitable for the same services as the diesels.

At least 21 Kanghaenggun-class locomotives have been rebuilt so far, numbered 강행군1.5-01 through 강행군1.5-21 (1.5 refers to 1 May, International Workers' Day). The previous identity of one unit is known - 1.5-13 was rebuilt from the former 632.

In addition to the units numbered in the 1.5-xx range, two others of this class have been noted, numbered 309 (painted dark green and white) and 399 (dark blue and white), which are distinctly different from the 1.5-series. Unlike those, which were rebuilt from original Soviet-built M62s, the bodies of these have all the distinctive features of the Kŭmsong-class, domestically built copies of the M62.

References

Locomotives of North Korea
Kim Chong-tae Works locomotives
3000 V DC locomotives
Railway locomotives introduced in 1998
Co′Co′ locomotives